Songs for Silverman is the second solo studio album by Ben Folds, released in April 2005 by Epic Records. The album reached No. 13 on the Billboard 200, making it Folds' highest-charting album until the release of Way to Normal in 2008.

The album is named after Ben Goldman, Folds' former A&R representative at Sony BMG.  Folds explained, "I was always sending songs to him for the album, so I wanted to name it after him. But somebody (from Sony) found out and flipped out, so I changed it a bit and turned it in." Goldman's name also spawned the title of Folds' compilation album Songs for Goldfish.

Singles
The first single, "Landed", reached No. 77 on the Billboard Hot 100 and No. 40 on the Adult Top 40.  A planned United Kingdom issue was cancelled, though the single received a digital-only release.

The single "Jesusland" reached No. 2 on the UK airplay chart in October 2005. It has also been playlisted by Xfm London and BBC Radio 2 (which lists it as "download only"). The track was slated for a UK single release in September 2005, but it never made it to store shelves. The video for the single features Matt Lucas as a televangelist interspersed with scenes of a journey through what may well be "Jesusland" itself. The track was featured in the 2008 documentary Religulous.

The album's next UK single, "Late", was written as a tribute to the recently deceased singer-songwriter Elliott Smith.

Other songs
The song "Gracie" is written about Folds' daughter. Folds also wrote a song about his son Louis on Rockin' the Suburbs, called "Still Fighting It".

"Weird Al" Yankovic, who directed Folds' video for "Rockin' the Suburbs," contributes backing vocals to "Time".

Track listing
All songs written by Ben Folds, except where noted.
"Bastard" – 5:23
"You to Thank" – 3:36
"Jesusland" – 4:30
"Landed" – 4:28
"Gracie" – 2:40
"Trusted" – 4:08
"Give Judy My Notice" – 3:37
"Late" – 3:58
"Sentimental Guy" – 3:03
"Time" – 4:30
"Prison Food" – 4:15

LP-only bonus track
"Bitches Ain't Shit" (Delmar Arnaud, Calvin Broadus, Jr., Ricardo Brown, Tracy Curry, Colin Wolfe, Andre Young) – 3:54

Japan-only bonus track
"Side of the Road" – 2:58

DVD-only bonus track
"Landed" (Strings Version) – 4:46

DVD listing
The Making of Songs for Silverman
Live performances
Interviews
Behind-the-scenes footage

The DualDisc additionally contains the entire album in Dolby Digital 5.1 surround sound.

Personnel
The Band
Ben Folds – piano, vocals
Jared Reynolds – bass, vocals
Lindsay Jamieson – drums, vocals

Additional musicians
Bucky Baxter – pedal steel (7, 11), 12-string guitar (7)
Frally Folds – backing vocals (7)
David Henry – cello (3, 5)
Ned Henry – violin (3)
John Mark Painter – double bass (5, 9), French horn (9)
Al Yankovic – backing vocals (10)

Charts

References

2005 albums
Ben Folds albums
Epic Records albums
Albums produced by John Mark Painter
Albums produced by Ben Folds